Associazione Sportiva Giana Erminio S.r.l. is an Italian football club based in Gorgonzola, Lombardy. The team currently plays in Italy's .

History
The club was founded in 1909 as Unione Sportiva Argentia, and later adopted the current name in honour of Erminio Giana, an alpino born in Gorgonzola.
After decades competing in the Italian regional leagues, in the 2012–13 season the club won the B group of Eccellenza Lombardy, and was promoted to the Serie D for the first time in its history. The following season the team won the A group of the 2013-14 Serie D, obtaining promotion to the 2014-15 Serie C.

Since its first season, the club established as a mid-table team in the league, also qualifying to the promotion playoffs during the 2016–17 season. In June 2018, 68-year old long time head coach Cesare Albè ended his 22-year tenure in charge of the club to become the club's vice-president; he was replaced as head coach by his assistant Raul Bertarelli. Cesare Albè returned as head coach between January and February 2019, and again from September 2019, following the dismissal of Riccardo Maspero. Giana was relegated back to Serie D by the end of the 2019–20 Serie C season, but was subsequently readmitted to fill a vacancy in the third division. In December 2020, Albé left his coaching duties for good, moving back to his previous role as vice-president, and was replaced by Oscar Brevi.

Colours and badge
The team's colours are white and sky blue.

Players

Current squad

Trophies
Eccellenza:
Promotion to Serie D: 2012–13
Serie D:
Serie D Girone A winners: 2013–14

References

External links
Official website 

Football clubs in Lombardy
Association football clubs established in 1909
Serie C clubs
1909 establishments in Italy